Joseph Haydn's Stabat Mater Hob. XXa:1 was written in 1767, for soprano, alto, tenor and bass soloists, mixed choir, 2 oboes both doubling English horn in the sections in E-flat major, strings and organ continuo. The first performance is believed to have taken place March 25, 1768 in Vienna with soloists Anna Maria Scheffstoss and Carl Friberth, with Haydn conducting from the harpsichord. Conductor Jonathan Green suggests adding a bassoon to double the bass line and perhaps just one player to each string part.

Haydn divides the setting into 13 movements:

 "Stabat Mater dolorosa" Largo, G minor, common time
 "O quam tristis et afflicta" Larghetto Affettuoso E-flat major, 3/8
 "Quis est homo qui non fleret" Lento, C minor, common time
"Quis non posset contristari" Moderato, F major, common time
 "Pro peccatis suae gentis" Allegro ma non troppo, B-flat major, common time
 "Vidit suum dulcem natum" Lento e mesto, F minor, common time
 "Eja Mater, fons amoris" Allegretto, D minor, 3/8
 "Sancta Mater, istud agas" Larghetto, B-flat major, 2/4
 "Fac me vere tecum flere" Lagrimoso, G minor, common time
 "Virgo virginum praeclara" Andante, E-flat major, 3/4
 "Flammis orci ne succendar" Presto, C minor, common time
 "Fac me cruce custodiri" Moderato, C major, common time
 "Quando corpus morietur" Largo assai, G minor, common time 
—"Paradisi gloria" G major, cut time

Pergolesi's setting of the Stabat Mater was already popular in Haydn's day despite criticisms of its not being serious enough. In his setting, Haydn aimed to be more serious while taking Pergolesi's setting as a model in some details, such as the "Vidit suum" which emulates "Pergolesi in its melodic traits, rhythmic quirks, and thin texture. Haydn, like Traetta, even adapted a feature of Pergolesi's text setting, the breaking up with rests of 'dum e-mi-sit spiritum' in order to convey the last gasps of the dying Christ." 

Indeed "Hasse was greatly impressed with Haydn's Stabat mater, which must have seemed to him an added vindication of the Neapolitan style [of Pergolesi] that he more than anyone else had brought to flower in central Europe." According to Haydn himself, four performances in Paris were very successful.

Haydn's Stabat Mater is considered "suitable for a penitential Good Friday program."

Notes

References
 Green (2002) Jonathan D. New York A Conductor's Guide to Choral-Orchestral Works, Classical Period: Volume 1: Haydn and Mozart Scarecrow Press
 Heartz (1995) Daniel. New York. Haydn, Mozart, and the Viennese School: 1740 — 1780 W. W. Norton & Co.
 Hugues (1974) Rosemary. London. Haydn. J. M. Dent & Sons Ltd
 Schenbeck (1996) Lawrence. Chapel Hill, North Carolina Joseph Haydn and the Classical Choral Tradition Hinshaw Music
 Webster (2006) James. Cambridge "Haydn's sacred vocal music and the aesthetics of salvation" Sutcliffe (editor) W. Dean Haydn Studies Cambridge University Press

External links
 
 Stabat Mater site

Compositions by Joseph Haydn
Haydn
1767 compositions